Zoran Jelikić (born August 4, 1954) is a former Serbian football player. He capped 8 times for Yugoslavia.

External links
Profile at Serbian federation official site

1953 births
Living people
Sportspeople from Šabac
Yugoslavia international footballers
Yugoslav footballers
Serbian footballers
Yugoslav First League players
Belgian Pro League players
FK Mačva Šabac players
Red Star Belgrade footballers
HNK Hajduk Split players
Standard Liège players
Serbian expatriate footballers
Expatriate footballers in Belgium
Association football defenders